The FBI Law Enforcement Bulletin has been published monthly since 1932 by the FBI Law Enforcement Communication Unit, with articles of interest to state and local law enforcement personnel.  First published in 1932 as Fugitives Wanted by Police, the FBI Law Enforcement Bulletin covers topics including law enforcement technology and issues, such as crime mapping and use of force, as well as recent criminal justice research, and VICAP alerts, on wanted suspects and key cases.

It was distributed to depository libraries which selected to receive it through v. 70 #3 (March 2001), at which GPO determined the online version provided a suitable alternative to hardcopy distribution. 

The initial hard copy volume was 5000 prints, reaching 45,000 prints with an estimate of 200,000 readers in 150 countries prior to being replaced by a digital version after December 2012.

References

External links

FBI Law Enforcement Bulletin page on FBI website

Federal Bureau of Investigation
Magazines established in 1932
Monthly magazines published in the United States
Magazines published in Washington, D.C.